Connemara is a region on the Atlantic coast of western County Galway, in the west of Ireland. The area has a strong association with traditional Irish culture and contains much of the Connacht Irish-speaking Gaeltacht, which is a key part of the identity of the region and is the largest Gaeltacht in the country. Historically, Connemara was part of the territory of Iar Connacht (West Connacht). Geographically, it has many mountains (notably the Twelve Pins), peninsulas, coves, islands and small lakes. Connemara National Park is in the northwest. It is mostly rural and its largest settlement is Clifden.

Etymology

Definition
One common definition of the area is that it consists of most of west Galway, that is to say the part of the county west of Lough Corrib and Galway city, contained by Killary Harbour, Galway Bay and the Atlantic Ocean. There are arguments about where Connemara ends as it approaches Galway city, which is definitely not in Connemara — some argue for Barna, on the outskirts of Galway City, some for a line from Oughterard to Maam Cross, and then diagonally down to the coast, all within rural lands.

Geography

The mountains of the Twelve Bens and the Owenglin River, which flows into the sea at  / Clifden, marked the boundary between the two parts. Connemara is bounded on the west, south and north by the Atlantic Ocean. In the north of the mountains, the boundary meets the sea at Killary, a few kilometres west of Leenaun.

The coast of Connemara is made up of multiple peninsulas. The peninsula of Errismore consists of the area west of the village of Ballyconneely. Errisbeg peninsula lies to the south of the village of Roundstone. The Errislannan peninsula lies just south of the town of Clifden. The peninsulas of Kingstown, Coolacloy, Aughrus, Cleggan and Renvyle are found in the north-west of Connemara. Of the numerous islands off the coast of Connemara, Inishbofin is the largest; other islands include Omey, Inishark, High Island, Friars Island, Feenish and Maínis.

History
The main town of Connemara is Clifden, which is surrounded by an area rich with megalithic tombs.

The famous "Connemara Green marble" is found outcropping along a line between Streamstown and Lissoughter. It was a trade treasure used by the inhabitants in prehistoric times. It continues to be of great value today. It is available in large dimensional slabs suitable for buildings as well as for smaller pieces of jewellery. It is used for the pendant for the Chief Scout's Award, the highest award in Scouting Ireland.

The east of what is now Connemara was once called , and was ruled by Kings who claimed descent from the Delbhna and Dál gCais of Thomond and kinship with King Brian Boru. The Kings of Delbhna Tír Dhá Locha eventually took the title and surname Mac Con Raoi (since anglicised as Conroy or King).

The Chief of the Name of Clan Mac Con Raoi directly ruled as Lord of Gnó Mhór, which was later divided into the civil parishes of Kilcummin and Killannin. Due to the power they wielded through their war galleys, the Chiefs of Clan Mac Con Raoi were traditionally considered to be, along with the Chiefs of Clans O'Malley, O'Dowd, and O'Flaherty, the Sea Kings of Connacht. The nearby kingdom of Gnó Beag was ruled by the Chief of the Name of Clan Ó hÉanaí (usually anglicised as Heaney or Heeney).

The  (Kealy) clan were the rulers of West Connemara.

According to Irish-American historian Bridget Connelly, "By the thirteenth century, the original inhabitants, the clans Conneely, Ó Cadhain, Ó Folan, and MacConroy, had been steadily driven westward from the Moycullen area to the seacoast between Moyrus and the Killaries. And by 1586, with the signing of the Articles of the Composition of Connacht that made Morrough O'Flaherty landlord over all in the name of Queen Elizabeth I, the MacConneelys and Ó Folans had sunk beneath the list of chieftains whose names appeared on the document. The Articles deprived all the original Irish clan chieftains not only of their title but also all of the rents, dues, and tribal rights they had possessed under Irish law."

During the 16th-century, however, legendary local pirate queen Grace O'Malley is on record as having said, with regard to her followers, "Go mb'fhearr léi lán loinge de chlann Chonraoi agus de chlann Mhic an Fhailí ná lán loinge d'ór" (that she would rather have a shipload of Conroys and MacAnallys than a shipload of gold).

One of the last Chiefs of Clan O'Flaherty and Lord of Iar Connacht was the 17th-century historian Ruaidhrí Ó Flaithbheartaigh, who lost the greater part of his ancestral lands during the Cromwellian confiscations of the 1650s.

After being dispossessed, Ó Flaithbheartaigh settled near Spiddal wrote a book of Irish history in New Latin titled Ogygia, which was published in 1685 as Ogygia: seu Rerum Hibernicarum Chronologia & etc., in 1793 it was translated into English by Rev. James Hely,  as Ogygia, or a Chronological account of Irish Events (collected from Very Ancient Documents faithfully compared with each other & supported by the Genealogical & Chronological Aid of the Sacred and Profane Writings of the Globe. Ogygia, the island of Calypso in Homer's The Odyssey, was used by Ó Flaithbheartaigh as a poetic allegory for Ireland. Drawing from numerous ancient documents, Ogygia traces Irish history back before Saint Patrick and into Pre-Christian Irish mythology.

Even so, another branch, also descended from the derbhfine of the Chiefs, continued to live in a thatch-covered long house at Renvyle and to act as both clan leaders and agents for the Anglo-Irish Blake family. This arrangement continued until 1811, when Henry Blake ended a 130-year-long tradition of his family acting as absentee landlords and evicted 86-year-old Anthony O'Flaherty, his relatives, and his retainers. Henry Blake then demolished Anthony O'Flaherty's longhouse and built Renvyle House on the site.

Even though Henry Blake later termed the eviction of Anthony O'Flaherty in Letters from the Irish Highlands, as "the dawn of law in Cunnemara" (sic), the Blake family is not remembered warmly in the region. Contemporary Anglo-Irish landlord John D'Arcy, who bankrupted both himself and his heirs to found the town of Clifden, is recalled much more fondly.

Connemara was drastically depopulated during the Great Famine in the late 1840s, with the lands of the Anglo-Irish Martin family being greatly affected and the bankrupted landlord being forced to auction off the estate in 1849:

The Sean nós song Johnny Seoighe is one of the few Irish songs from the era of the Great Famine that still survives.

The Irish Famine of 1879 similarly caused mass starvation, evictions, and violence in Connemara against the abuses of power by local Anglo-Irish landlords, bailiffs, and the Royal Irish Constabulary. In response, Father Patrick Grealy, the Roman Catholic priest assigned to Carna, selected ten, "very destitute but industrious and virtuous families", from his parish to emigrate to America and be settled upon frontier homesteads in Moonshine Township, near Graceville, Minnesota, by Bishop John Ireland of the Roman Catholic Diocese of St. Paul.

According to historian Cormac Ó Comhraí, during the decades immediately preceding the First World War, politics in Connemara was largely dominated by the pro-Home Rule Irish Parliamentary Party and its ally, the United Irish League. At the same time, though, despite an almost complete absence of the Sinn Fein political party in Connemara, the militantly anti-monarchist Irish Republican Brotherhood had a number of active units throughout the region. Furthermore, many County Galway veterans of the subsequent Irish War of Independence traced their belief in Irish republicanism to a father or grandfather who had been in the IRB.

The first transatlantic flight, piloted by British aviators John Alcock and Arthur Brown, landed in a boggy area near Clifden in 1919.

Renvyle House was burned down by the Anti-Treaty IRA during the Irish Civil War, but later rebuilt by Oliver St John Gogarty and turned into a hotel.

Irish language, literature, and folklore

The population of Connemara is 32,000. There are between 20,000–24,000 native Irish speakers in the region, making it the largest Irish-speaking . The Enumeration Districts with the most Irish speakers in all of Ireland, as a percentage of population, can be seen in the South Connemara area. Those of school age (5–19 years old) are the most likely to be identified as speakers.

Connemara, which was formerly called "The Irish Highlands", has had an enormous influence on Irish culture, literature, and folklore. 

Micheál Mac Suibhne, a Connacht Irish bard mainly associated with Cleggan, remains a locally revered figure, due to his genius level contribution to oral poetry and sean-nós singing in Connacht Irish.

After emigrating from Connemara to the United States during the 1860s, Bríd Ní Mháille, a Bard in the Irish language outside Ireland and sean-nós singer from the village of Trá Bhán, Garmna, composed the caoine  Amhrán na Trá Báine. The song is about the drowning of her three brothers after currach was rammed and sunk while they were out at sea. Ní Mháille's lament for her brothers was first performed at a ceilidh in South Boston, Massachusetts before being brought back to Connemara, where it is considered an Amhrán Mór ("Big Song") and remains a very popular song among both performers and fans of both sean-nós singing and Irish traditional music.

During the Gaelic revival, Irish teacher and nationalist Patrick Pearse, who would go on to lead the 1916 Easter Rising before being executed by firing squad, owned a cottage at Rosmuc, where he spent his summers learning the Irish language and writing. According to Innti poet and literary critic Louis de Paor, despite Pearse's enthusiasm for the Conamara Theas dialect of Connacht Irish spoken around his summer cottage, he chose to follow the usual practice of the Gaelic revival by writing in Munster Irish, which was considered less Anglicized than other Irish dialects. At the same time, however, Pearse's reading of the radically experimental poetry of Walt Whitman and of the French Symbolists led him to introduce Modernist poetry into the Irish language. As a literary critic, Pearse also left behind a very detailed blueprint for the decolonization of Irish literature, particularly in the Irish language.

During the aftermath of the Irish War of Independence and the Civil War, Connemara was a major center for the work of the Irish Folklore Commission in recording Ireland's endangered folklore, mythology, and oral literature. According to folklore collector and archivist Seán Ó Súilleabháin, residents with no stories to tell were the exception rather than the rule and it was generally conceded in 1935 that there were more unrecorded folktales in the parish of Carna alone than anywhere else in Western Europe.

One of the most important tradition bearers the Commission recorded in Connemara or anywhere else was Éamon a Búrc. Before his repertoire of tales was recorded and transcribed, a Búrc had emigrated to America and lived in Graceville, Minnesota and in the Connemara Patch shantytown in the Twin Cities. After returning to his native Carna, Éamon a Búrc became a tailor and was recorded in 1935 at the home now owned the Ó Cuaig family. Furthermore, according to Irish-American historian Bridget Connelly, the stories collected in Irish from Éamon a Búrc are still taught in University courses alongside Beowulf, the Elder Edda and the Homeric Hymns.

Joe Heaney a legendary seanchai and sean-nós singer in Connacht Irish, is said to have known more than 500 songs – most learned from his family while he was growing up in Carna. The Féile Chomórtha Joe Éinniú (Joe Heaney Commemorative Festival) is held every year in Carna.

Sorcha Ní Ghuairim, a Sean-nós singer and writer of Modern literature in Irish, was also born in Connemara. Initially a newspaper columnist termed ‘Coisín Siúlach’ for the newspaper The Irish Press, where she eventually became the editor. She also wrote a regular column for the children's page under the pen name ‘Niamh Chinn Óir’. Her other writings included a series of children's stories titled Eachtraí mhuintir Choinín and Sgéal Taimín Mhic Luiche. With the assistance of Pádraig Ó Concheanainn, Sorcha also translated Charles McGuinness' Viva Irlanda for publication in the newspaper. Their translation was subsequently published under the title Ceathrar comrádaí in 1943.

While living at Inverin, Connemara during the Emergency, however, Calum Maclean, the brother of highly important Scottish Gaelic poet Sorley MacLean, was appointed by Professor Séamus Ó Duilearga (1899–1980) as a part-time collector for the Irish Folklore Commission (Coimisiún Béaloideasa Éireann). From August 1942 to February 1945, Maclean sent a considerable amount of lore in the local Conamara Theas dialect of Connaught Irish to the Commission, amounting to six bound volumes. From March 1945 Maclean was employed as a temporary cataloguer by the Commission in Dublin, before being sent to the Scottish Gàidhealtachd to collect folklore there as well, first for the Irish Folklore Commission and later for the School of Scottish Studies.

While interned during the Second World War in the Curragh Camp by Taoiseach Éamon de Valera, Máirtín Ó Cadhain, a Post-Civil War Irish republican from An Spidéal, became one of the most radically innovative writers of Modern literature in Irish by writing the comic and modernist literary classic Cré na Cille.

The novel is written almost entirely as conversation between the dead bodies buried underneath a Connemara cemetery. In a departure from Patrick Pearse's idealization of the un-Anglicised Irish culture of the Gaeltachtaí, the deceased speakers in Cré na Cille spend the whole novel gossiping, backbiting, flirting, feuding, and scandal-mongering. Cré na Cille is widely considered a masterpiece of 20th-century Irish literature and has drawn comparisons to the writings of Flann O’Brien, Samuel Beckett and James Joyce.

Through Cré na Cille and his other writings, Máirtín Ó Cadhain became a major part of the revival of literary modernism in Irish, where it had been largely dormant since the execution of Patrick Pearse in 1916. Ó Cadhain created a literary language for his writing out of the Conamara Theas and Cois Fharraige dialects of Connacht Irish, but he was often accused of an unnecessarily dialectal usage in grammar and orthography even in contexts where realistic depiction of the Connemara vernacular wasn't called for. He was also happy to experiment with borrowings from other dialects, Classical Irish and even Scottish Gaelic. Consequently, much of what Ó Cadhain wrote is, like the poetry of fellow Linguistic experimentalist Liam S. Gógan, reputedly very hard to understand for a non-native speaker.

In addition to his writings, Máirtín Ó Cadhain was also instrumental in preaching what he called Athghabháil na hÉireann ("Re-Conquest of Ireland"), (meaning both decolonization and re-Gaelicisation) and in the 1969 founding of Coiste Cearta Síbialta na Gaeilge (English: Irish Language Civil Rights Committee"), a pressure group campaigning for social, economic and cultural rights for native-speakers of the Irish-language in Gaeltacht areas and which drew inspiration from the use of civil disobedience by the contemporary Welsh Language Society, the Northern Ireland civil rights movement, and the American civil rights movement.

One of their most successful protests involved the pirate radio station Saor Raidió Chonamara (Free Radio Connemara) which first came on the air during Oireachtas na Gaeilge 1968, as a direct challenge to the Irish government's inaction regarding Irish language broadcasting. The station used a medium wave transmitter smuggled in from the Netherlands. The Irish government responded by proposing a national Irish-language radio station RTÉ Raidió na Gaeltachta which came on the air on Easter Sunday 1972. Its headquarters are now in Casla.

In 1974, Gluaiseacht also persuaded Conradh na Gaeilge to end the practice since 1939 of always holding Oireachtas na Gaeilge, a cultural and literary festival modeled after the Welsh Eisteddfod, in Dublin rather than in the Gaeltacht areas. Gluaisceart also successfully secured recognition of sean-nós dance in 1977.

Recently, the Coláiste Lurgan, a language immersion summer college located at Inverin, has won worldwide acclaim for their Irish language covers of pop songs,including Leonard Cohen's Hallelujah, Adele's Hello, and Avicii's Wake Me Up, on the TG Lurgan YouTube channel. The band Seo Linn is composed of musicians who met at the college.

Transport
From 1895 to 1935 it was served by the Midland Great Western Railway branch that connected Galway City to Clifden.

The N59 is the main area road, following an inland route from Galway to Clifden. A popular alternative is the coastal route beginning with the R336 from Galway. This is also known as the Connemara Loop consisting of a 45 km drive where one can view the landscape and scenery of Connemara.

Notable places

Towns and villages
These settlements are within the most extensive definition of the area. More restrictive definitions will exclude some:

 Barna –
 Ballyconneely – ( / )
 Ballynahinch –
 Carna –
 Carraroe –
 Claddaghduff –
 Cleggan –
 Clifden –
 Clonbur –
 Inverin –
 Kilkerren –
 Leenaun – ( / Leenane)
 Letterfrack –
 Lettermore –
 Lettermullan –
 Maum – (also )
 Oughterard –
 Recess –
 Renvyle –
 Rosmuc –
 Rossaveal –
 Roundstone –
 Spiddal –

Islands
 Omey Island –
 Inishbofin – has been home to fishermen, farmers, exiled monks and fugitive pirates for over 6,000 years and today the island supports a population of 200 full-time residents.

Notable people 
 Seán 'ac Dhonncha (1919–1996), sean-nós singer
 Nan Tom Teaimín de Búrca, a local sean-nós singer, lives near Carna in Rusheenamanagh
 Róisín Elsafty, sean-nós singer
 John Ford, the American film director, and winner of 4 Academy Awards, whose real name was Seán O'Feeney, was the son of John Augustine Feeney from An Spidéal, and directed the classic film The Quiet Man in nearby Cong, County Mayo.
 Máire Geoghegan-Quinn is an Irish politician, and was the former European Commissioner for Research, Innovation and Science was born in Carna.
 Claire Hanna, SDLP MP in Westminster was born here.
 J. Bruce Ismay, Chairman of the White Star Line, which owned the Titanic, lived for part of his later life in his lodge in Connemara. Ismay was on board the Titanic when it sank but was one of the survivors.
 Seán Mannion, a professional boxer who fought for the WBA, was born in Rosmuc.
 Richard Martin, MP, known as "Humanity Dick", was born in Ballynahinch Castle, Ballynahinch and represented Galway in the House of Commons.
 Michael Morris, 3rd Baron Killanin, was president of the International Olympic Committee (IOC), and lived at the family seat in Spiddal.
 Patrick Nee, Rosmuc-born Irish-American organized crime figure turned Irish republican, senior member of the Mullen Gang, and mastermind of an enormous arms trafficking ring to the Provisional IRA from bases in Charlestown, South Boston, and Gloucester, Massachusetts and which paid protection money to local crime boss Whitey Bulger.
 Sorcha Ní Ghuairim (1911–1976) was a teacher, writer of modern literature in Irish, and sean-nós singer.
 Peter O'Toole, the noted actor of stage and screen, who achieved international stardom in 1962 playing Col. T.E. Lawrence in Lawrence of Arabia, was born in Connemara in 1932, according to some accounts of his life.
 K. S. Ranjitsinhji, Maharaja Jam Sahib of Nawanagar State in British India, was the first head of state to make an official visit to the newly founded Irish Free State, bought Ballynahinch Castle estate and visited the area every year till his death in 1932.
 Major John Riley, an Irish Catholic soldier from Clifden, who deserted from the United States Army over anti-Catholicism in the United States and religious persecution by White Anglo-Saxon Protestant officers. Riley became a Major in the Mexican Army and the commanding officer of the highly decorated Saint Patrick's Battalion during the Mexican–American War.
 Tim Robinson, a cartographer, has lived many years in Connemara and published books on the area.
 Gráinne Seoige, the Irish TV presenter and journalist, who has worked for TG4, RTÉ, Sky News Ireland and the BBC, is a native of An Spidéal.
 Síle Seoige, the Irish TV presenter and journalist. She is the younger sister of Gráinne Seoige and a fellow native of An Spidéal
 Mairtin Thornton was a heavyweight boxer, nicknamed the "Connemara Chrusher", he was the Irish Heavyweight boxing champion in 1943, and fought Bruce Woodcock for the British heavyweight title in 1945.

Cultural references
 French singer Michel Sardou had an international hit with the song "Les Lacs du Connemara" in 1981. 
 The Irish drinking song "The Hills of Connemara" has been recorded and performed by a number of Irish and Celtic-themed bands.
 Poet Carl Sandburg's home of 22 years in Flat Rock, North Carolina, which is now a national monument, is named after the Connemara region. 
 Conamara Chaos is a region of chaotic terrain on Jupiter's moon Europa.
 The Connemara pony is a breed of horse native to the region. The only native pony breed in Ireland. 
 Connemara is also the name of a brand of Irish whiskey produced at the Cooley Distillery.

Annalistic references

 807. A slaughter was made of the Conmaicni by the foreigners.

Film and TV 
 The Quiet Man, 1952, film by John Ford
 The Field, 1990, film by Jim Sheridan 
 Cré na Cille, 2007, film by Robert Quinn
 The Guard, 2011, film by John Michael McDonagh
 Black '47, 2018, film by Lance Daly

Literature
 Mícheál Mac Suibhne, agus Filidh an tSéibhe, 1934, poetry collection, edited by Tomas Ó Maille, Dublin, Foils. an Rialtais,
 Cré na Cille, 1949, novel, by Máirtín Ó Cadhain, 
 The Beauty Queen of Leenane, 1996, play by Martin McDonagh
 Star of the Sea, 2011, novel by Joseph O'Connor
 The Crow of Connemara, 2015, novel by Stephen Leigh
 Secrets of the Lighthouse, 2015, by Santa Montefiore
==See also==

 Alcock and Brown's first non-stop flight across the Atlantic crash landed near Clifden
 
 Connacht Irish
 Connemara Heritage & History Centre
 Connemara National Park
 Joyce Country
 Lough Corrib
 The Twelve Pins and Maumturks mountains
 The Western Way (Long-distance trail)
 The Connemara Pony
 Wild Atlantic Way
 Lord Connemara

References
 A Chorographical Description of West or H-Iar Connaught written A.D. 1684 by Roderic O'Flaherty ESQ with notes and Illustrations by, James Hardiman M.R.I.A., Irish Archaeological Society, 1846.

External links
 Connemara after the Famine at History Ireland
 Love Connemara – Visitor Guide to the Connemara Region
 Connemara News – Useful source of information for everything related to this area of West Ireland: environment, people, traditions, events, books and movies.

 
Geography of County Galway
Gaeltacht places in County Galway
O'Flaherty dynasty
Conmaicne Mara